The Lewis Gouverneur and Nathalie Bailey Morris House is a historic building at 100 East 85th Street on the Upper East Side of Manhattan in New York City. The five-story dark red brick house was built in 1913-14 as a private residence for Lewis Gouverneur Morris, a financier and descendant of Gouverneur Morris, a signer of the Articles of Confederation and United States Constitution, and Alletta Nathalie Lorillard Bailey. In 1917, Morris & Pope (Lewis Governeur Morris’ stock brokerage firm) is bankrupt but the family retains ownership of this house as well as their house in Newport, RI because his wife owned the property as collateral for a loan to him for his brokerage business. Alletta Nathalie Bailey Morris was a leading women's tennis player in the 1910s, winning the national indoor tennis championship in 1920.

Design
Designed by the famous architect Ernest Flagg using an asymmetrical plan, the house's distinctive style was inspired by English Queen Anne architecture, along with Colonial and Federal architectural styles. The building features staggered stair windows, half-fan windows in pairs, a double height oriel over the garage, and a square cupola.

Later life
The building was later also called the New World Foundation Building. Its address is 1015 Park Avenue, although its entrance is around the corner at 100 East 85th Street. The house was made a New York City Designated Landmark on January 24, 1967, and was added to the National Register of Historic Places in 1977. Its facade was restored by the Avi Chai Foundation in 2000.

See also
National Register of Historic Places listings in Manhattan from 59th to 110th Streets

References

Houses on the National Register of Historic Places in Manhattan
Houses completed in 1914
Houses in Manhattan
Upper East Side
Park Avenue
Morris family (Morrisania and New Jersey)
New York City Designated Landmarks in Manhattan